James Fairburn was an English professional footballer who played as an inside forward. He started his career with Darlington before joining Football League First Division side Burnley in May 1899. He made his debut for the club on 2 September 1899 in the 0–2 defeat away at Glossop. However, he was replaced by Walter Place for the following match and never played again for the club. Fairburn was subsequently released by Burnley in March 1900.

References

Year of birth missing
Year of death missing
English footballers
Association football forwards
Darlington F.C. players
Burnley F.C. players
English Football League players